Konrad Tom (9 April 1887 – 9 August 1957), born Konrad Runowiecki, a Polish Jewish actor, writer, singer and director, born in Warsaw. Wrote song lyrics in Polish and in Yiddish for stage, film and cabaret, including szmonces. His wife was actress Zula Pogorzelska.

"Yiddish talkies were not only comparable to those of the Polish mainstream but were produced by the same people. The most successful Yiddish talkies were directed by established industry figures including Waszyński, Ford, Henryk Szaro, Jan Nowina-Przybylski, Leon Trystan, and Konrad Tom."

Screenplays:
 Antek policmajster 1935 (with Emanuel Schlechter)
 Ada, to nie wypada 1936
 Bolek i Lolek and Dodek na froncie, 1936, both starred Adolf Dymsza, music Henryk Wars and Walter Dana
 Yidl Mitn Fidl (Judeł gra na skrzypcach), Yiddish, 1936, starring Molly Picon
 Książatko 1937
 A Diplomatic Wife (Dyplomatyczna żona) (1937) 
 Adventure in Warsaw (Abenteuer in Warschau) (1937)
 Mamele, Yiddish, 1938, starring Molly Picon, music director Ivo Wesby
 Włóczegi 1939
 Wielka droga 1946

Song lyrics:
 Kocha, lubi, szanuje (with Emanuel Schlechter, performed by Mieczysław Fogg)
 Nic o tobie nie wiem (with Emanuel Schlechter, music Henryk Wars)
 Zlociste wloski, Tyle milosci performed by Eugeniusz Bodo
 Madame Loulou to music by Harry Waldau

Actor:
 1932 – Sto metrów miłości 1933 – Jego ekscelencja subiekt 1933 – Romeo i Julcia 1934 – Co mój mąż robi w nocy? 1935 – ABC miłości 1935 – Antek policmajster 1935 – Wacuś 1937 – Pani minister tańczy''

References

1887 births
1957 deaths
Jewish cabaret performers
Jewish songwriters
Polish cabaret performers
Polish film directors
Polish male film actors
19th-century Polish Jews
Polish songwriters
Male actors from Warsaw
People from Warsaw Governorate
Jews from the Russian Empire
Burials at Hillside Memorial Park Cemetery
20th-century comedians
20th-century Polish screenwriters
Male screenwriters
20th-century Polish male writers
Polish emigrants to the United States